Paglaum Party, officially the Partido Paglaum sang Banwa, is a provincial political party in Negros Occidental, Philippines based in Bacolod.

Establishment
Paglaum was established as the pioneer local political party in Negros Occidental by the late former Bacolod Mayor Alfredo Montelibano, Jr. in 1988 for his political run. Despite the similarity in names, Bukidnon Paglaum Party is not related to the Negros Occidental Paglaum Party.

Notable politicians
After the incumbency of Mayor Montelibano, Paglaum Party continued as a minority party that fielded candidates to the City Council. One of the notable members and former members include:

 Alfredo Montelibano, Jr.: Governor of Negros Occidental, 1968-1986, Mayor of Bacolod, 1988-1995
 Oscar Verdeflor: Mayor of Bacolod, 1998-2001 
 Luzviminda Valdez: Vice Mayor of Bacolod, 1998-2001, Mayor, 2001-2004
 Ramiro Garcia, Jr.: Vice Mayor of Bacolod, 2001-2004
 Alex Paglumotan: Member, Bacolod City Council, 2007-2016

Recent participation
Reactivated as a local party on December 14, 2015, Paglaum participated in the 2016 Bacolod local elections under the Grupo Progreso Coalition of Mayor Evelio Leonardia. It fielded George Zulueta as a candidate but failed to gain a seat in the Bacolod City Council.

See also
 United Negros Alliance

References

Local political parties in the Philippines
Politics of Negros Occidental
Regionalist parties in the Philippines